Ekinci is a Turkish word that may refer to:

People
 Ekrem Ekinci, Turkish scientist and academic
 Ekrem Buğra Ekinci (born 1966), Turkish academic
 Nurcihan Ekinci, Turkish female para taekwondo practitioner
 Tuğba Ekinci (born 1976), Turkish pop singer
 Yusuf Ekinci (1942–1994), Turkish Kurdish communist separatist

Places
 Ekinci, Adıyaman, a village in the district of Adıyaman, Adıyaman Province, Turkey
 Ekinci, Kahta, a village in the district of Kahta, Adıyaman Province, Turkey

See also
 Ekinci, Erzincan
 Ekinciler, Göynük, a village in the district of Göynük, Bolu Province

Turkish-language surnames